Samsul Hadi (23 April 1959 - 15 September 2014) was an Indonesian politician who served as the regent of Banyuwangi, East Java. He served between 2000 and 2005.

Regent 
During his tenure, he initiated a tourism project in which the government created a replica of a Majapahit-era explorer ship, meant to undergo an expedition to promote the regency. However, the ship sank. Under his term, the construction of Blimbingsari Airport was initiated.

Corruption case 
In 2007, he was arrested and convicted of corruption regarding the construction of Blimbingsari Airport, a floating dock, and the purchase of LCTs operating in the Bali Strait. He was sentenced to six years in prison in 2008 for the LCT case. Due to his old age, he was not transferred to the usual prison for corruption, but was held at Banyuwangi instead. He was convicted once more in 2010 for the airport case, adding an additional 6 years to his sentence.

Death 
During his time in prison, he fell down in a bathroom. Samsul passed away two days later on 15 September 2014, 01.30 WIB following a hospital treatment. He was survived by his wife and three children.

Initially meant to be buried in a public cemetery, he was instead buried in a burial complex for Banyuwangi's Regents.

References 

1959 births
2014 deaths
Javanese people
People from Banyuwangi Regency
Indonesian politicians convicted of corruption
Regents of places in East Java